Piedmont High School is a public high school in Unionville, North Carolina, United States. The mascot of the school is the Panther, and the current principal is Dylan Stamey. The school's motto  is the acronym PACE, standing for "Piedmont Academics Character Excellence."

History 
Piedmont was founded in 1960 as the second high school in Union County. After 2005, school enrollment was divided due to the newly built Porter Ridge High School. Country music star Trace Adkins spoke at Piedmont's 50th graduating class ceremony on June 14, 2010.

Athletics 
Currently, the teams compete in the Southern Carolina 3A Conference.

The Panthers were the 1984 and 2013 2A state baseball champions.

The school has also had individual state champions in swimming, wrestling, and track and field. The football team had a 31-game regular season winning streak from 2001–2003, winning the district title during that run.

Currently, the biggest rival of Piedmont is Porter Ridge. Historically, Piedmont's biggest rival in high school football was Forest Hills High School.

The wrestling team has had a state finals showing three years in a row, facing the same team each time, Croatan, winning in 2011–2012 with an undefeated record.

The Piedmont Varsity cheerleaders have become highly competitive and won a fifth place title at state out of 22 squads.

Notable alumni 
 Hudson Shank (c/o 2021), actor (Young Thad) in Blue Mountain State: The Rise of Thadland
 Andy Tomberlin (c/o 1985), former MLB player from 1993–1998

References

Educational institutions established in 1960
Public high schools in North Carolina
Schools in Union County, North Carolina
1960 establishments in North Carolina